A fakaleitī (or leiti or fakafefine or lady) is a Tongan individual assigned male at birth who has a feminine gender expression.  The term fakaleitī is made up of the prefix faka- (in the manner of) and the borrowing lady from English. Fakaleitīs themselves prefer to call themselves leitī or ladies. 

Although leitī in Tonga do not necessarily associate with LGBT identities in the Western world, those who grow up in Tongan migrant communities in New Zealand, Australia, and the United States may find a greater level of community and affinity to similar identities than leitī in the island kingdom.

Leitī or fakafefine are similar to Samoan fa'afafine and Hawaiian māhū.

The Tonga Leitis' Association organizes the Miss Galaxy Pageant in Tonga. They have also been involved in reforming colonially influenced laws about leitī life that remain in Tonga.  In 2018 a documentary film, Leitis in Waiting, was made about leitī leader Joey Mataele and the efforts of the Tonga Leitis' Association.  Mataele also works with the Pacific Equality Project, a non-profit group advocating for the decriminalization of LGBT peoples from post-colonial laws in the Pacific Islands.

See also 
 List of transgender-related topics

References

Bibliography

External links
 Like a Lady in Polynesia

Gender in Oceania
Gender systems
Third gender
Tongan culture
Transgender in Oceania
Society of Tonga
LGBT in Tonga
Indigenous LGBT culture